Colugos are arboreal gliding mammals that are native to Southeast Asia. Their closest evolutionary relatives are primates. There are just two living species of colugos: the Sunda flying lemur (Galeopterus variegatus) and the Philippine flying lemur (Cynocephalus volans). These two species make up the entire family Cynocephalidae and order Dermoptera (not to be confused with Dermaptera, an order of insects known as earwigs).

Despite being called "flying lemurs", the colugos do not fly and are not lemurs, although related. Instead, they glide as they leap among trees. They are the most capable gliders of all gliding mammals. A fur-covered membrane, called a patagium, connects to the face, paws, and tail. They are also known as cobegos.

Characteristics 
Colugos are nocturnal, tree-dwelling mammals.

Appearance and anatomy 
They have long, slender front and rear limbs, a medium-length tail, and a relatively light build. The head is small, with large, front-focused eyes for excellent binocular vision, and small rounded ears.

The incisor teeth of colugos are highly distinctive; they are comb-like in shape with up to 20 tines on each tooth. The incisors are analogous in appearance and function to the incisor suite in strepsirrhines, which is used for grooming. The second upper incisors have two roots, another unique feature among mammals. The dental formula of colugos is:

Movement 

Of all the gliding mammals, colugos have the most perfected adaptation for flight. They have a large membrane of skin that extends between their paired limbs and gives them the ability to glide significant distances between trees. This gliding membrane, or patagium, runs from the shoulder blades to the fore paws, from the tip of the rear-most fingers to the tip of the toes, and from the hind legs to the tip of the tail. The spaces between the colugo's fingers and toes are webbed. As a result, colugos were once considered to be close relatives of bats. Today, on account of genetic data, they are considered to be more closely related to primates.

Colugos are unskilled climbers; they lack opposable thumbs. They progress up trees in a series of slow hops, gripping onto the bark with their small, sharp claws. They spend most of the day resting. At night, colugos spend most of their time up in the trees foraging, with gliding being used to either find another foraging tree or to find possible mates and protect territory.

Behavior and diet 
Colugos are shy, nocturnal, solitary animals found in the tropical forests of Southeast Asia. Consequently, very little is known about their behavior. They are herbivorous and eat leaves, shoots, flowers, sap, and fruit. They have well-developed stomachs and long intestines capable of extracting nutrients from leaves and other fibrous material.

Colugos have evolved into a nocturnal species, along with the ability to proficiently see during the nighttime. Colugos spend their days resting in tree holes and are active at night time; traveling around 1.7 km at night. Colugos may also be a territorial species.

Lifecycle 
Although they are placental mammals, colugos raise their young in a manner similar to marsupials. Newborn colugos are underdeveloped and weigh only . They spend the first six months of life clinging to their mother's belly. The mother colugo curls her tail and folds her patagium into a warm, secure, quasipouch to protect and transport her young. The young do not reach maturity until they are two to three years old. In captivity, they live up to 15 years, but their lifespan in the wild is unknown.

Status 
Both species are threatened by habitat destruction, and the Philippine flying lemur was once classified by the IUCN as vulnerable. In 1996, the IUCN declared the species vulnerable owing to destruction of lowland forests and hunting. It was downlisted to least-concern status in 2008 but still faces the same threats. In addition to the ongoing clearing of its rainforest habitat, it is hunted for its meat and fur. It is also a favorite prey item for the critically endangered Philippine eagle; some studies suggest colugos account for 90% of the eagle's diet.

Classification and evolution 
 Order Dermoptera
  †Family Plagiomenidae?
 †Planetetherium
 †Planetetherium mirabile
 †Plagiomene
 †Plagiomene multicuspis
  †Family Mixodectidae?
 †Dracontolestes
 †Dracontolestes aphantus
 †Eudaemonema
 †Eudaemonema cuspidata
 †Mixodectes
 †Mixodectes pungens
 †Mixodectes malaris
  Family Cynocephalidae
 Cynocephalus
 Philippine flying lemur, Cynocephalus volans
 Galeopterus
 Sunda flying lemur, Galeopterus variegatus
 †Dermotherium
 †Dermotherium major
 †Dermotherium chimaera

The Mixodectidae and Plagiomenidae appear to be fossil Dermoptera. Although other Paleogene mammals have been interpreted as related to dermopterans, the evidence for this association is uncertain and many of the fossils are no longer interpreted as being gliding mammals. At present, the fossil record of definitive dermopterans is limited to two species of the Eocene and Oligocene cynocephalid genus Dermotherium.

Recent molecular phylogenetic studies have demonstrated that colugos emerged as a basal Primatomorpha clade which is a basal Euarchontoglires clade. Treeshrews (order Scandentia) emerged as sister of Glires (lagomorphs and rodents), in an unnamed sister clade of the Primatomorpha.

Synonyms 
The names Colugidae, Galeopithecidae, and Galeopteridae are synonyms for Cynocephalidae. Colugo, Dermopterus, Galeolemur, Galeopithecus, Galeopus, and Pleuropterus are synonyms for Cynocephalus.

Gallery

References

External links 

Flying lemurs are the closest relatives of primates

 
Priabonian first appearances
Extant Eocene first appearances